Stegenagapanthia is a genus of longhorn beetles of the subfamily Lamiinae, containing the following species:

 Stegenagapanthia albovittata Pic, 1924
 Stegenagapanthia nivalis Holzschuh, 2007

References

Lamiini